New Bern High School is a high school in New Bern, North Carolina, USA, whose students come from the New Bern, Trent Woods, Brices Creek and James City area. It is located in Craven County. The student population is approximately 1,700, and there are 165 faculty and staff members. The student-teacher ratio is approximately 14:1.

Sports

Athletic teams overview 
The sports program consists of American football, boys' and girls' soccer, boys' and girls' lacrosse, swimming, track and field, indoor track, cross country, boys' and girls' basketball, volleyball, baseball, softball, wrestling and cheerleading.

New Bern High School has won numerous state, regional and conference championships. State team championships include baseball (1966), American football (2007, 2012, 2014, 2022) and track (2006–2009).

The school competes in the Eastern Carolina 3A/4A Conference, which is made up of New Bern, Havelock, Jacksonville, Northside-Jacksonville, D.H. Conley, South Central and J.H. Rose.

Track and field 
The track team won the NCHSAA 4A Boy's State Outdoor Championship meet in 2006, 2007, 2008 and 2009. In 2009, New Bern runners ran the third fastest high school 4×200 relay (1:27.02) on record at the time, and on March 27, 2009, its 4×400 relay team set the national indoor record at 3:13.06. A national record which stood for nearly 10 years.

American football 
NBHS Football has won 4 state championships. The school won three football state championships under its former head coach, Bobby Curlings and one under their current head coach, Torrey Nowell.

 On December 10, 2007, the New Bern Bears beat the Charlotte Independence High Patriots for the state 4AA championship.
 On November 30, 2012 the Bears became the North Carolina 4A State Champions by beating Porter Ridge High School (Indian Trail) 39–38.
 On December 12, 2014, won the 2014 NCHSAA State 4A Championship with a 25–13 victory over Charlotte Catholic, completing the season with a school record of 16–0.
 on December 9, 2022 New Bern won the 4A NCHSAA championship vs Grimsley (Greensboro), 40-28. Finishing with the record of 16-0.

The football team plays its home games at Caruso-Coates Stadium and the Bobby Curlings Field, located on campus.

Fine arts 
The school offers band, chorus, dance, theatre and art classes.

Band
The band program consists of a competitive marching band, concert band, symphonic band, wind ensemble and winter guard. The bands have competed and performed in North Carolina, Virginia, Georgia and Washington D.C. In 2018, the wind ensemble was invited to perform at the North Carolina Music Educators’ Association Professional Development Conference.

The winter guard program was started in winter 2013. It competes in the Atlantic Indoor Association Circuit (South). Accolades include the 2016 AIA SRA2 Gold Medal, 2017 AIA  A3 Bronze Medal, and 2022 AIA SRA1 Bronze Medal.

The Indoor Percussion program's accolades include the 2022 AIA PSEA Bronze Medal.

Chorus
The chorus program performs at NCMEA events. It has traveled to New York city on numerous occasions.

Theatre
The theatre program performs local productions, including traditional plays such as Hamlet and Romeo and Juliet and musicals such as Little Shop of Horror. The program competes in the North Carolina Thespians Competition.

Art
The art program is very active in the school and local community, with numerous student art pieces on display.

Dance
The dance program performs at school concerts and throughout the community. It also includes an auditioned group called Terpsichore.

Naval JROTC 
The NJROTC at New Bern High School earned "Distinguished Unit" honors for 15 consecutive years (2004–2018).

AVID 
New Bern High School is an AVID school. In 2018, the school was recognized as School-wide site of Distinction. In 2022 the school earned the distinction of being awarded the status of National Demonstration in School. Only 217 schools have received this honor.

Notable alumni
 Bill Bunting, professional basketball player
 Davon Drew, NFL tight end with the Baltimore Ravens, played collegiately at East Carolina University
 Elwood Edwards, voice of AOL's "You've got mail" sound among other greetings
 Montario Hardesty, NFL running back for the Cleveland Browns, played collegiately at the University of Tennessee
 Nathan Healy, professional basketball player
 Mike Hughes, NFL cornerback for the Minnesota Vikings, played collegiately at the University of Central Florida
 Sinisa Malesevic, member of Royal Irish Academy, Professor of Sociology at University College Dublin, Ireland
 Michael R. Morgan, Associate Justice on the North Carolina Supreme Court
 Dan Neil, Pulitzer Prize winner, automotive journalist
 Kevin Reddick, former NFL linebacker
 Brian Simmons, NFL linebacker for the Cincinnati Bengals and New Orleans Saints, played collegiately at UNC Chapel Hill
 Adam Warren, Major League Baseball pitcher

References

External links
New Bern High School home page

Public high schools in North Carolina
Schools in Craven County, North Carolina
Buildings and structures in New Bern, North Carolina